A chameleon is an Old World lizard belonging to the family Chamaeleonidae.

Chameleon (or variants such as chamaeleon and cameleon) may also refer to:

Literature
 Chameleon (novel), a financial thriller novel by Richard Hains
 Chameleon, a character from the 1977 Piers Anthony novel A Spell for Chameleon
 "The Chameleon" (short story), an 1884 short story by Anton Chekhov
 The Chameleon (magazine), 1894 magazine

Comics
 Chameleon (Marvel Comics), a fictional Marvel Comics supervillain
 Chameleon (manga), a 1990 Japanese manga series
 Reep Daggle or Chameleon, a fictional DC Comics superhero

Computing
 Cameleon (programming language)
 Chameleon, a suite of TCP/IP client applications from NetManage
 Chameleon (computing), a computer workstation
 Chameleon (GIS), a web mapping application development kit
 Chameleon botnet

Films and television
 Cameleon (film), a 1997 British film
 Chameleon (1995 film), American film
 Chameleon (1998 film), American TV film
 Chameleon (2008 Hungarian film)
 Chameleon (2008 Japanese film)
 Chameleon (2016 film), Chilean film
 The Chameleon (1920 film), a silent comedy film
 The Chameleon (2010 film), film directed by Jean-Paul Salomé
 The Chameleon, a 1989 adult film by John Leslie
 Chameleon (Battlestar Galactica), a character from Battlestar Galactica
 "Chameleon" (The Twilight Zone), a 1985 episode of The New Twilight Zone
 "Chameleon" (Xiaolin Showdown), an episode of Xiaolin Showdown
 "The Chameleon" (The Outer Limits), an episode of  The Outer Limits
 Chameleons (TV movie), a science fiction television program
 The Chameleon, a character from T.U.F.F. Puppy
 The Chameleon, a Kaiju clone character from Godzilla: The Series
 The Chameleons, characters in the Doctor Who serial The Faceless Ones

Games
 Chameleon (2005 video game), a stealth-action video game
 The Chameleon (party game), a 2017 deception game
 Chameleon (Dungeons & Dragons), a prestige class in Dungeons & Dragons
 Chameleon (G.I. Joe), a fictional in the G.I. Joe universe
 Chameleon (Mortal Kombat), a character in the Mortal Kombat video game series
 Chameleon: To Dye For!, a 2008 video game by Starfish SD
 Chameleon (video game console), a cancelled game console

Music
 The Chameleon Club, a music venue in Lancaster, Pennsylvania
 Chameleon (label)

Artists
 Chameleon (American band), a 1970s American band
 Chameleon (Anglo-Canadian band), a country-rock quartet formed in 1975
 Chameleon (British band), a British vocal group founded in 1989 by Nigel Hess
 Jose Chameleone (born 1979), Ugandan musician
 The Chameleons, a UK post-punk band

Albums
 Caméléon (album), a 2012 album by Shy'm
 Chameleon (EP), a 2017 EP by Grey
 Chameleon (Margaret Berger album)
 Chameleon (Maynard Ferguson album), 1974
 Chameleon (The Four Seasons album), 1972
 Chameleon (Helloween album), 1993
 Chameleon (Labelle album)
 Chameleon (Måns Zelmerlöw album)
 Chameleon, a 1980 album by Tiny Tim

Songs
 "Caméléon" (song), by Maître Gims
 "Chameleon" (Ira Losco song), 2015
 "Chameleon" (Michela Pace song), a 2019 song that represented Malta in the Eurovision Song Contest
 "Chameleon" (Pnau song), 2016
 "Chameleon" (composition), a 1973 song by Herbie Hancock from Head Hunters
 "Chameleon", a 1970 song by Creedence Clearwater Revival from Pendulum
 "Chameleon", a video-single by Metis (American musician)
 "Chameleon", a 1976 song by Elton John from Blue Moves
 "Chameleon", a 2015 song by Hardwell and Wiwek

Science
 Cameleon (protein), an artificial protein
 Chamaeleon, a constellation
 Chamaeleon (plant), a genus of plants
 Chameleon particle, a hypothetical elementary particle
 American chameleon or Carolina anole (Anolis carolinensis), a species of arboreal lizard

Other uses
 Chamaeleon (philosopher) (c. 350 – c. 275 BC), ancient Greek philosopher

See also
 K-Meleon, a web browser
 Kamelion, a fictional character in Doctor Who
 Khameleon, a character in the Mortal Kombat video game series